The Old Clock at Zion's First National Bank is installed in Salt Lake City, Utah, United States. The structure is listed on the National Register of Historic Places.

See also

 National Register of Historic Places listings in Salt Lake City

References

External links
 
 The Old Clock at The Historical Marker Database

Buildings and structures completed in 1870
Buildings and structures in Salt Lake City
Clocks in the United States
National Register of Historic Places in Salt Lake City